Geodiidae is a family of sea sponges.

Genera 
Caminella Lendenfeld, 1894
Caminus Schmidt, 1862
Depressiogeodia Cárdenas, Rapp, Schander & Tendal, 2010 (temporary name)
Erylus Gray, 1867
Geodia Lamarck, 1815
Melophlus Thiele, 1899
Pachymatisma Bowerbank, 1864
Penares Gray, 1867

References

Tetractinellida